Sammarinese authorities license private vehicles with distinctive licence plates which are white with blue figures, usually a letter followed by up to four numbers. To the left of these figures is displayed the national coat of arms of San Marino. Many vehicles also carry the international vehicle identification code "RSM" in black on a white oval sticker. Since 2004 custom licence plates have also become available.

There are 220 km (135 mi) of roads in the country: the main road is the San Marino Highway.

Special plates

References

External links
 

Road transport in San Marino
San Marino
San Marino-related lists